Natalie Anter (born 6 April 1980) is an Italian softball player who competed in the 2004 Summer Olympics.

She played for the North Carolina Tar Heels.

References

1980 births
Living people
Italian softball players
Olympic softball players of Italy
Softball players at the 2004 Summer Olympics
Softball players from California
People from Upland, California
North Carolina Tar Heels softball players